Capioma is an unincorporated community in Capioma Township, Nemaha County, Kansas, United States.

History
Capioma was platted in 1857. It was named for an Indian chief.

A post office was opened in Capioma in 1857, and remained in operation until it was discontinued in 1906.

References

Further reading

External links
 Nemaha County maps: Current, Historic, KDOT

Unincorporated communities in Nemaha County, Kansas
Unincorporated communities in Kansas
1857 establishments in Kansas Territory